Nimal Mendis is a Sri Lankan singer/songwriters who has won many awards for his music. Mendis recorded 22 songs, eight of them for the  Decca Records label in London. He has written songs now regarded as classics in  South Asia—including ' Master Sir' about Colonial  Ceylon. His songs have been aired over  BBC Radio, Premier Radio (UK) and across radio stations in  Europe in the 1960s. He appeared on BBC TV's 'Top of the Pops' program with Sandra Edema singing his composition 'Feel Like A Clown.'

"A crusader for creative and original song writing, using the Sri Lankan folk idiom, Nimal Mendis was successful in influencing many a young lyricist and music composer in acknowledging the wealth in Sri Lankan folk music and adapting it with western overtones, to bring about a new identity in music..." (Mahes Perera, writing in the Sunday Observer Sri Lanka)Source: Sunday Observer Sri Lanka

Alphabetical List of Nimal Mendis songs.

A 
 Agony & Ecstasy
 Always Asking Why
 And A Star
 And Michael Said
 A Second Chance Mr. Jones

B 
 Butterfly In The Rain
 Black Pearl
 Blessed Are The Poor
 Beyond The Sun
Bread Of Life

C 
 Cherry Blossom Tree
 Champagne Blues
 Cold Cold Night
 Compassion
 Cloud 9

D 
 Doi Doi Doi
 Diya Manthi Nila
 Dreamlight
 Diyamanthi Adare
 Dance Baila Dance

E 
 Eka Mawakage Diyaniyak
 Earth Mother Crying
 End Of A Dream
Evan Ahlaya

F 
 Fisherman's Song
 Felicia
 Fool's Paradise
 Feel Like A Clown
 Follow Me
 Fountains Of Paradise
 Ferryman

G 
 Green Diamond
 God King Theme
 Go Go Go
 Ganga Addara (translated into Sinhala by Augustus Vinayagaratnam)
 Garabandal Song
 Ghennu Lamaine
 Girls
 Giri Hisen

H 
 Hurt
 Here I Am
 Here And Now

I 
 It's What I am

J 
 Jivithaye

K 
 Kandyan Dance
 Kandyan Express
 Kiss Kiss Kiss

L 
 Light Floods In
 Look Into Yourself

M 
 Master Sir
 Mage Sihiniya
 Mahaweli
 Master Hand
 Meditate
 Men Of Little Minds

N 
 Nim Him

O 
 Open Every Door
 Obey Adare
 Oba Mata Kiyai

P 
 Puthu Ma Hisay

R 
 Ran Tikiri Sina (translated into Sinhala by Augustus Vinayagaratnam)
 Razor Edge

S 
 Sri Lanka My Sri Lanka
 Such A Love Is Blind
 Sudu Unnahey

T 
 Tsunami Sri Lanka

U 
 Upul Nuwan Vidaha

V 
Viyo Gee Gayena Hadhe

External links
 Nimal Mendis Tsunami Song
  Sinhala Juke Box Tsunami Relief - Nimal Mendis
 Nimal Mendis Autism Song for Autism Speaks UK
 Lee Scott MP Presented With A Nimal Mendis Song For Autism
 Nimal Mendis releases a Song for Autism in London
 Daily News Sri Lanka: Nimal Mendis composes tsunami song by Ivan Corea
 Sunday Island Sri Lanka - Two tsunami songs mentioned in the British parliament with kudos to Nimal Mendis by Nan
The Guardian UK: Nimal Mendis composes Tsunami Song
 Tsunami Sri Lanka News: Nimal Mendis

Mendis, Nimal